Teofilo Spasojević (Serbian Cyrillic: Теофило Спасојевић; 21 January 1909 – 28 February 1970) was a Serbian football player.

Biography
Playing as a left-back, he was known for his classy, elegant style, correctness and excellent positioning in the field.

He started playing in the youth teams of Belgrade's SK Jugoslavija, where he played most of his career, from 1929 until 1935, making with Milutin Ivković, considered by many as the best full-back of the pre-1941 Yugoslav football, one of the best defences. He played for the club in 110 official matches.

He played twice for the Yugoslavia national football team. His début was on 6 May 1928 in Belgrade against Romania, a 3–1 win, and his other, and last, match was on 3 August 1930, a friendly in Buenos Aires against Argentina, a 1–3 loss, just after the 1930 FIFA World Cup, in which he was part of the team, but didn't play any match. Despite having been a remarkable player, the competition in the defence didn't allow him to have more caps for the national team.

After retiring, he enrolled the Belgrade Law School and has earned a degree. He died in winter of 1970, at 61 years of age.

References

1909 births
1970 deaths
Footballers from Belgrade
Serbian footballers
Yugoslav footballers
Yugoslavia international footballers
1930 FIFA World Cup players
SK Jugoslavija players
Association football defenders
University of Belgrade Faculty of Law alumni